The Basel School of Business (also known as BSB) is a private business school in Basel, Switzerland.

History 
2012 BSB receives a license as a private school on May 22, 2012, by the Canton of Basel City.

2012 Launch of the Master of Business Administration (MBA) programs.

2013 Moved from the original Gartenstrasse location to the Centralbahnplatz in Basel.

2015 Launch of the Bachelor of Science in International Business program.

2015 The first MBA cohort graduated.

2015 The Basel School of Business receives institution-wide certification from eduqua.

2016 The Bachelor of Science in International Business program is added.

2018 The Basel School of Business is accredited by the International Accreditation Council for Business Education (IACBE)  and the Council for Higher Education Accreditation (CHEA). 

2018 The Basel School of Business receives continued institution-wide certification from eduqua.

2018 Undergraduate students from the Basel School of Business in collaboration with Ballet Theater Basel and Loop Tanz produce "Dance for MS," a fundraising performance to spread awareness for Multiple Sclerosis.

2020 The Basel School of Business creates a Grocery Shopping Assistance program for vulnerable populations during the COVID-19 lockdown.

2022 Within 2 weeks of the start of the Ukrainian Invasion, BSB students and faculty establish Switzerland's largest collection station and delivered over 40 tons of relief supplies to Ukraine.

2022 The school creates and operates "PhilMart" to provide food, clothing, and other basic necessities to Ukrainian refugees.

2022 The Basel School of Business receives continued institution-wide certification from eduqua.

Academic programs

BSB offers a Bachelor of Science in Business Administration on-campus degree, a Bachelor of Business Administration (Top-Up) degree completion program, a flexible Master of Business Administration (MBA) degree, and a cohort based management Executive Master of Business Administration degree.

The Bachelor of Science in Business Administration (BSBA) program is a three-year full-time on-campus program. The BSBA combines a liberal-arts based core curriculum with specializations in various business disciplines including: Accounting & Finance, Human Resource Management, Global Marketing, International Business, and International Hospitality Management. The Bachelor of Business Administration (Top-Up) program allows students with an accredited higher national diploma to earn a bachelor's degree by completing a 27-credit upper-level undergraduate sequence of courses. The BBA can be taken online or on-campus, full-time or part-time.

The Basel School of Business offers a 36-credit Master of Business Administration (MBA) program. The MBA curriculum consists of three components, a business core, an area of specialization and a capstone. The areas of specialization include: International Business, International Hospitality Management, Organizational Systems and Change, and Transformational Marketing.

Accreditations

BSB programs are accredited by the International Assembly for Collegiate Business Education (IACBE) and the Council for Higher Education Accreditation (CHEA). BSB is certified by eduqua the Swiss Quality Certificate for Adult Continuing Education Institutions.

Affiliations

The Basel School of Business is a signatory to the United Nation's PRME - Principles for Responsible Management Education initiative.

References

Business schools in Switzerland
Private schools in Switzerland